Charles Claude Selecman (1874–1958) was an American Methodist minister and educator. He served as the third President of Southern Methodist University from 1923 to 1938. In 1938, he was elected as an American bishop in the Methodist Episcopal Church, South.

Early life
Charles Claude Selecman was born on October 13, 1874, in Savannah, Missouri. In 1882, he attended Central College in Fayette, Missouri, but never graduated.

Career
Selecman worked as a pastor in Pattonsburg, Missouri, in 1898. Later, he was a missionary in Louisiana and Missouri. In 1913, he was a pastor in Los Angeles, California. By 1914, he became the pastor of the newly built Trinity Auditorium in Downtown Los Angeles. 

Selecman moved to Dallas, Texas, in 1920, where he became the pastor of the newly built First Methodist Church, South. Three years later, he was appointed as the third President of Southern Methodist University, serving from 1923 to 1938. Under his leadership, the campus buildings went from two to seven, and the endowment from US$883,000 to US$2,300,000.

Selecman resigned in 1938 and became a bishop in Oklahoma City. He moved back to Dallas in 1944. In 1945, he was elected President of the Council of Bishops of the Methodist Church. He also served as the President of the Methodist General Board of Evangelism.

Selecman retired in 1948, and was elected to the Methodist Hall of Fame in philanthropy in 1951.

Personal life
Selecman married Bess Kyle Beckner on April 27, 1899. They had a son, Dr. Frank Selecman, who married Eloise Olive and had two children - Charles Edward Selecman and Mary Selecman Deaton and a daughter, Josephine, who married Douglas Warren Forbes. Bess died in 1943 and Selecman married his second wife, Jackie (Mrs. Pierre D. Mason of Hollywood, California,) in June 1948.

Bishop Selecman had 3 great-grandchildren; Cyndy Selecman Morgan (deceased 11-15-12), Betsi Selecman Schaefer, and Amie Selecman.

Death
Selecman died on March 27, 1958, in Dallas, Texas.

Publications
 The Methodist First Reader "On Being a Christian", by Charles Claude Selecman
 The Methodist Primer, by Charles Claude Selecman

See also
List of bishops of the United Methodist Church

References

1874 births
1958 deaths
People from Savannah, Missouri
People from Los Angeles
People from Dallas
Clergy from Oklahoma City
Central Methodist University alumni
Presidents of Southern Methodist University
Bishops of the Methodist Episcopal Church, South
Methodist writers
20th-century Methodist bishops